Judith MacDougall (born 1938) is an American visual anthropologist and documentary filmmaker, who has made over 20 ethnographic films in Africa, Australia and India. For many of the films, she worked with her husband, David MacDougall, also an anthropologist and a documentary filmmaker. Both of them are considered among the most significant anthropological filmmakers in the English-speaking world.

Early life and education
MacDougall was born in the United States. She enrolled in the ethnographic film program at the University of California, Los Angeles, where she met her husband, David. Together, they would go on to make some 20 ethnographic films, across Australia, Africa, and India.

Filmography
 Indians and Chiefs ( 1967)
 The House-Opening (1977)
 The Wedding Camels (1980)
 Takeover (1980) 
 A Wife Among Wives (1981) (co-directed with David MacDougall)
 Three Horsemen (1982) 
 Collum Calling Canberra (1984) 
 Sunny and the Dark Horse (1986) 
 Photo Wallahs (1991) 
 Diyas (2001)

Bibliography

References

External links

Visual anthropologists
American anthropologists
Living people
University of California, Los Angeles alumni
Cultural anthropologists
Social anthropologists
American documentary film directors
1938 births